Cernik is a settlement in the municipality of Žumberak, Zagreb County, Croatia. The population is 11 (census 2011). In 1835, Cernik had 8 houses and 73 residents.

Cernik is a traditionally preserved settlement and a valuable architectural heritage, near Sošice. Cernik was mentioned in historical documents for the first time in 1249 in Bernard's gift book.

References

Populated places in Zagreb County